Colin O'Donoghue (born 26 January 1981) is an Irish actor and musician, best known for portraying Captain Killian "Hook" Jones on the  ABC TV show Once Upon a Time. He appeared in the 2011 horror thriller film The Rite (2011) as a skeptical novice priest, Michael Kovak. He portrayed the character of Douxie Casperan in the Guillermo del Toro animated series Tales of Arcadia for Netflix. He is also portraying Gordon Cooper on Disney+ Original Series The Right Stuff. He starred in Dolly Parton's Heartstrings as J.J. Sneed.

Early life and education
Colin O'Donoghue, the son of Con and Mary O'Donoghue, was born and raised in Drogheda, County Louth, in a Roman Catholic family. He has an older brother named Allen. He is the cousin of musician Harry O'Donoghue. He attended Dundalk Grammar School, and later The Gaiety School of Acting in Dublin. At age 16, he went to Paris for a month to learn French.

Career
O'Donoghue's early career was mainly split between theatre and television work in Ireland and the UK. In 2003, he won the Irish Film and Television Award for "Best New Talent" for his role as Norman in "Home For Christmas".

In 2009, he appeared as Duke Philip of Bavaria in an episode of season 3 of the Showtime historical-fiction series The Tudors. He made his Hollywood film debut alongside Anthony Hopkins in the horror thriller film The Rite (2011). He made an audition video for The Rite in a friend's home studio in Drogheda and sent it to the United States. He plays guitar and sings in a band called The Enemies, formed in 2003 in Ireland.

In 2012, O'Donoghue was cast as Captain Hook/Killian Jones, love interest of the main heroine Emma Swan, in the second season of the hit ABC series Once Upon a Time. In 2014, O'Donoghue was cast as the main character in The Dust Storm, an independent film set in Nashville, Tennessee as a musician named Brennan.

Christina Perri wrote a song, "The Words", which she dedicated to Colin's character (Captain Hook) in Once Upon a Time.

In December 2018, O'Donoghue was cast in an episode of the Netflix anthology drama series, Heartstrings. The series premiered on 22 November 2019.

The Enemies
O'Donoghue was part of the five-piece Irish band, "The Enemies", which was formed in 2003 by O'Donoghue and a close friend, Ronan McQuillan. The Enemies released their self-titled debut EP on 7 March 2011 prior to their self-funded first album on track. He played guitar and sang backing vocals on the band's first EP and debut album.

Although the band was unsigned, it was commissioned by General Motors to record tracks for their "Chevy route 66" online campaign. The band worked on the music for Coca-Cola's "5BY20" project. Their debut album Sounds Big on the Radio was to be released in March 2013, which was later scheduled for 2014. In May 2013, he announced he was leaving the band due to the filming schedule of Once Upon a Time.

Awards
For his role in Home for Christmas, he was awarded Best New Talent at the 1st Irish Film & Television Awards, held on 1 November 2003.

Personal life
O'Donoghue married his wife Helen, a schoolteacher, in 2009, shortly after his appearance on The Tudors. The couple have been together since they were eighteen and have two children: a son and a daughter.

Filmography

Film

Television

Video games

Music videos

Theatre

Awards and nominations

See also

 List of Irish people

References

External links

 

Living people
1981 births
21st-century guitarists
21st-century Irish male actors
21st-century Irish  male singers
Irish guitarists
Irish male film actors
Irish male soap opera actors
Irish male stage actors
Irish male television actors
Irish male guitarists
Male actors from County Louth
Musicians from County Louth
People from Drogheda